= Poonchola =

- village
- Location in Kerala, India Poonchola (India)
- Coordinates: 11°1′0″N 76°32′0″E
- Country: India
- State: Kerala
- District: Palakkad

Languages
  - Official: Malayalam, English
- Time zone: UTC+5:30 (IST)
- Vehicle registration: KL-
- Coastline: 0 kilometres (0 mi)
- Nearest city: Mannarghat
- Lok Sabha constituency: Palakkad

Poonchola is a village in Kanjirapuzha Panchayath, Palakkad district, Kerala, India.
